Gelidium is a genus of thalloid red algae comprising 134 species. Its members are known by a number of common names.

Taxonomy and Nomenclature 
Gelidiaceae has 159 species, considered to be the largest family in Gelidiales with four major genera: Capreolia, Gelidium, Gelidiophycus, and Ptilophora.

Gelidium was first described by Lamouroux in 1813 and is regarded to be one the genus with the most species. Species diversity has been established by previous studies, whereas, molecular analysis reveals biogeographic relations that concerns its current distribution pattern in oceans.

Identification of species has been a challenge as sexual plants are somewhat difficult to find in nature, therefore, other physiological features are examined instead, such as branching patterns and vegetative traits, but subsequent studies revealed that these are also affected by its development and environmental factors highlighting the need for genetic studies utilizing genetic markers.

Morphology 
Branching is irregular, or occurs in rows on either side of the main stem. Gelidium produces tetraspores. Many of the algae in this genus are used to make agar. Chaetangium is a synonym.

Distribution 
Gelidium are widely distributed globally, specifically in tropical to temperate regions, but lacking in polar regions. In the ocean, Gelidium can be found inhabiting the intertidal to subtidal zone. Species from the genus require further studies to distinguish boundaries among members, as recent molecular research have shown that there are cryptic, unidentified species assumed to be regionally endemic and isolated but may also be ubiquitous in nature. Some species are common in the Atlantic and Pacific Ocean (G. crinale) while some are confined in North Atlantic waters (G. pussillum). Reports of G. pussillum occurrence outside of its specified range may be questionable and requires further verification.

Ecology 
Gelidiales consists of many species that are economically important as they produce agar while some serve ecologically significant functions such as substrate cover. The growth of Gelidium can primarily be affected by nutrient availability and light. In turn, these factors are also regulated by temperature and water movement, respectively. Santelices (1991) evaluated how eight factors may affect Gelidium productivity, all of which are important in understanding how different interactions correlate to production yield. Some of these factors include seasonality, phenotypic characters, age, reproductive state, and even the source of the algae.

Life History 
Gelidium is assumed to follow the Polysiphonia life cycle, with sexual and tetrasporangial generations. Tetrasporangia formation is also known to be affected by temperature and other environmental factors including light, salinity and moisture, although germination rates remain unaffected based on an earlier study.

In 1993, Gelidium robustum in Santa Barbara, California was investigated for 16-months showing tetrasporangial abundance throughout the year, but may not have the ability to germinate despite maximum spore output.

Cultivation and Exploitation 
An important agarophyte, Gelidium has been cultured in Korea and China since the early 1990s, with some cultivation efforts noted in Europe, specifically in Spain and Portugal. In South Africa, G. pristoides (Turner) has been cultivated in the field while laboratory trials on G. crinale (Turner) and Pterocladiella capillacea (Gmel.) Santelices and Hommersand were tested in Israel.

Gelidium has been found to be over-exploited in Japan, depleting algal beds which in part, affects agar production, pushing the need for even more efforts in cultivation, replacing the practice of harvesting wild Gelidium. In 2017, global data have shown that Norway, China, and Chile are among the countries that lead the overharvesting of seaweeds, mostly kelp.  Advances in Gelidium cultivation have been put forth including the use of floaters at sea and marine ponds for free-float technology in cultivation. At its core, environmental factors are needed to be controlled for favorable growth of Gelidium revealing how ponds may be the better option among the set-ups.

Chemical Composition 
Agar is primarily extracted from Gelidium especially among North African Atlantic and South European species based on specific gel properties with water. In Morocco, Gelidium sesquipidale is known to be harvested during summer time to extract agar used commercially, making the country among the top producers in the world.

Agarocolloids are known to be extracted in algae belonging to the orders Gracilariales and Gelidiales with certain applications in the food and cosmetics. Gelling properties often differ among species, seasons, seaweed age, and substitutions between sulphate esters, among other compounds.  Sulphate composition often dictates gel strength, while methyl esters determine gelling and elasticity.

Utilization and Management 
In Portugal, G. sesquipedale are commonly harvested for agar since the 1960s. Management strategies are yet to be implemented especially among big commercial companies that should be responsible in harvesting the resource, similar to South Africa where the decrease in annual Gelidium landings show how fisher folk shifted to collecting kelp for abalone feeds instead of Gelidium harvesting.

Gelidium as environmental records
Gelidium species have been collected, pressed and maintained in herbaria and personal collections from the 1850s onwards since seaweed collecting became a popular pastime for the middle classes as well as scientists in Europe and North America. These numerous well-documented specimens can provide information beyond taxonomy.

Sensitive measurement of stable nitrogen isotope ratios in Gelidium species collected in southern Monterey Bay between 1878 and 2018 showed a pattern of changes that matched with changes in the California current and provided support for a theory about the end of the local fishing industry. Nitrogen isotope ratios are well established as a measure of nutrient productivity in aquatic ecosystems. The California current runs along coastal California and correlation with information on fish catches indicates that an increase in nutrient-rich cold water is important for fish productivity, notably sardines. The California current has only been measured since 1946. The correlations with the Gelidium nitrogen ratios allowed the California current to be projected back into the nineteenth century and compared with historical records of fish catches. The data matched, notably for the highest sardine catches through the 1930s and then the sudden decrease from 1945 to 1950 that ended the Monterey cannery industry. This information supports the theory that environmental changes as well as overfishing caused the collapse of the local fishery business. More broadly, this suggests that elemental analysis of historical samples of macroalgae can provide evidence of primary productivity processes. The species used included specimens of G. coulteri, G. robustum, G. purpurascens, G. pusillum and G. arborescens collected over a 140-year timespan from the 6 km coastline between Point Pinos, Pacific Grove and Cannery Row, Monterey in California, US.

Species

Notes

References

Toefy, R., Gibbons, M.J. & McMillan, I.K. 2005. The foraminifera associated with the alga Gelidium pristoides, South Africa. African Invertebrates 46: 1-26.

External links
Images  of Gelidium at Algaebase

Gelidiaceae
Red algae genera